Mont Clare is a station on Metra's Milwaukee District West Line in the Montclare community area in Chicago, Illinois. In Metra's zone-based fare system, Mont Clare is in zone B. As of 2018, Mont Clare is the 145th busiest of Metra's 236 non-downtown stations, with an average of 303 weekday boardings. It is also the last outbound station in Chicago's city limits.

As of December 12, 2022, Mont Clare is served by 41 trains (20 inbound, 21 outbound) on weekdays, by all 24 trains (12 in each direction) on Saturdays, and by all 18 trains (nine in each direction) on Sundays and holidays.

Mont Clare station consists of three tracks and two side platforms. The middle track has no platform, so stopping trains must use the outer tracks. Metra's North Central Service trains use these tracks but do not stop.

Bus connections
CTA
 65 Grand
 74 Fullerton

References

External links 

Station from Sayre Avenue from Google Maps Street View
Station from Nordica Avenue from Google Maps Street View

Metra stations in Chicago
Former Chicago, Milwaukee, St. Paul and Pacific Railroad stations
Railway stations in the United States opened in 1956